Ilse Koolhaas (born 11 June 1997) is a Dutch water polo player for AS Orizzonte Catania and the Dutch national team.

She participated at the 2018 Women's European Water Polo Championship.

References

1997 births
Living people
Dutch female water polo players
Expatriate water polo players
Dutch expatriate sportspeople in Italy
Water polo players at the 2020 Summer Olympics
Olympic water polo players of the Netherlands
World Aquatics Championships medalists in water polo
21st-century Dutch women